Joy-Maria Frederiksen (born May 21, 1964) is a Danish actress, educated from Danish National School of Theatre and Contemporary Dance. Her television appearances include Jeg ville ønske for dig, TAXA, Pas på mor, Hvide løgne, Better Times (Krøniken) og The Killing (Forbrydelsen).

Private life 
Since 1992, she has been married to her colleague Niels Olsen. Together, they have the daughter Rosa.

Filmography 
 De nøgne træer – (1991)
 Roser & persille – (1993)
 Royal blues – (1997)
 Baby Doom – (1998)
 Mistænkt – (2001)
 Kuren – (2001)
 En kort en lang – (2001)
 Min søsters børn i sneen – (2002)
 En som Hodder – (2003)
 Helligtrekongersaften – (2004)
 Drømmen – (2006)
 Vikaren - (2007)
 Kapgang - (2014)

TV appearances

References

External links 
 
 Joy-Maria Frederiksen at danskefilm.dk (Danish)
 Joy-Maria Frederiksen at Filmdatabasen (Danish)

1964 births
Living people
Danish actresses